The Permanent Mission of Afghanistan to the United Nations is the formal title of the Islamic Republic of Afghanistan delegation to the United Nations (UN). Afghanistan officially joined the United Nations on 19 November 1946 as the Kingdom of Afghanistan.

Leadership
The Permanent Representative of Afghanistan to the United Nations is the leader of the Afghanistan Mission to the United Nations. 

The current Permanent Representative of Afghanistan is Ghulam M. Isaczai.

The Taliban, who are in effective control of most of Afghanistan have nominated Suhail Shaheen as their envoy to the United Nations in September 2021, but their request has not been approved yet.

The Building
The Afghanistan Permanent Mission to the United Nations is housed in a building located at 633 Third Avenue Floor 27 A, New York 10017.

See also

 Afghanistan and the United Nations
 List of current Permanent Representatives to the United Nations
 Foreign relations of Afghanistan
 Diplomatic missions of Afghanistan

References

Afghanistan
Diplomatic missions of Afghanistan
Diplomatic missions in Manhattan
Afghanistan and the United Nations
Afghanistan–United States relations